is a Japanese footballer currently playing as a defender for Gainare Tottori.

Career statistics

Club
.

Notes

References

1999 births
Living people
Tokyo University of Agriculture alumni
Japanese footballers
Association football defenders
J3 League players
Gainare Tottori players